Football (soccer) is the most popular sport in Hong Kong, followed by rugby union. The Hong Kong Football Association (HKFA) is the governing body for football in Hong Kong.

History 

The first football club of Hong Kong is Hong Kong Football Club, usually known as The Club, founded in 1886. The club is one of the oldest existing football clubs in Asia. 

The first football competition of Hong Kong is the Challenge Shield, which founded in 1898. Its format is similar to the FA Challenge Cup in England. 

Tracing back to early 20th century, the Hong Kong football league was founded in 1908. It is probably the oldest professional league in Asia. Most records before the Second World War have been lost and not many people can remember the old glory of Hong Kong's professional football. 

The Hong Kong Football Association, the governing body of Hong Kong football, was founded in 1914 and is one of the oldest football associations in Asia.

In the 1970s and 1980s, football in Hong Kong was strong and popular, with competitive local teams boosted by well known overseas players and managers, playing in front crowds of tens of thousands.

In 1985, in a famous match, Hong Kong upset China, 2-1, in Beijing to move towards a place in the 1986 World Cup. The team ultimately fell short of qualification.

In recent years, major attempts have been made by Hong Kong government to improve both HKFA’s governance and the quality of Hong Kong football under a government scheme called ‘Project Phoenix’.

Football league system
All the football leagues are organised by the HKFA.

Premier League
The Hong Kong Premier League began its first season in 2014–15 and is the top flight in Hong Kong. There are eight teams who compete in the league, all of whom are fully professional.

Lower Divisions
The lower divisions consist of the Hong Kong First Division (D1 League), the Second Division League (D2 League), and the Third Division League (D3 League). Most of the teams in the lower divisions are amateur with the occasional semi-professional team. The bottom 4 teams of the Third Division League are eliminated from the league system

2022–23 season

Cup competitions
All the cup competitions are also organised by the HKFA. Among them, the HKFA Cup and Senior Shield are probably the oldest professional football competitions in Asia - even earlier than the league.

There are several cup competitions for clubs at different levels of the football pyramid. The most important cup competition is the Senior Shield, with the winners of the FA Cup qualifying for the AFC Cup.

 The Senior Shield, established in 1896, is the oldest football knockout inter-club competition in Asia.
 The Junior Shield, established in 1922, is a cup competition for clubs playing in levels 2–4 of the football pyramid. It was reformed in 2013 and is currently known as the FA Cup Junior Division.
 The FA Cup, established in 1974, is Hong Kong's second major cup competition. The winners of the FA Cup receive either a berth in the AFC Champions League or the AFC Cup.
 The Sapling Cup, established in 2015, is a cup competition designed to provide young players in the top flight with more first-team minutes. Each club is obligated to have a minimum of three players under the age of 22, on the pitch in each match. 
 The Community Cup: is a single match played each September between the champions of the Hong Kong Premier League and the champions of the FA Cup.

There have also been a number of other cup competitions which are no longer run:

 The League Cup (2000–2009, 2010–2012, 2014–2016) was an annual football competition contested by clubs in the Hong Kong Premier League. It was being discontinued in the 2009–10 season but was relaunched for the 2010–11 season. However, the cup was discontinued again following the 2015–16 season.
 The Community Shield (2009–2010) is a single match played each August between the champions and first runners-up of the previous season's First Division League.
 The Viceroy Cup (1969–1998) was the first football competition in Hong Kong which allowed business sponsorship.

Cup eligibility
Senior Shield: Level 1 
FA Cup: Level 1
Sapling Cup: Level 1
Community Cup: Level 1
FA Cup Junior Division: Level 2–4

Notable clubs
Kitchee
Eastern
South China
Happy Valley
Sun Hei
HKFC
Instant Dict.
Seiko (defunct)
List of football clubs in Hong Kong

National teams

Men's

The Hong Kong national football team represents Hong Kong in men's international football events.  The team competed their first international match in 1947 against South Korea during the colonial period.  Even after 1997 the transfer of sovereignty to China, it continues to represent Hong Kong separately from the People's Republic of China as its own national team in international competitions due to the "One country, two systems" principle.  The team has never qualified for the FIFA World Cup, with the closest time being the 1986 World Cup cycle, which also highlighted their most successful period. Recent success include winning the East Asian Games in 2009.

Women's

The Hong Kong women's national football team qualified for 14 consecutive AFC Women's Asian Cups between 1975 and 2003. However, the team has not qualified for a major tournament since the 2003 AFC Women's Championship.

References

External links
HKFA official site - English version (Chinese version also available)
Hong Kong Football - (English version)